The 1993 season was the second complete year of competitive football (soccer) in Estonia since gaining independence from the Soviet Union in 1991-08-20. The Men's National Team booked its first victory since independence by defeating Lithuania at the Baltic Cup, on 1993-07-04.

National Leagues

Meistriliiga

Esiliiga

Estonian FA Cup

Quarterfinals

Semifinals

Final

National Team

Notes

External links
1992–1993 season on RSSSF
RSSSF Historic Results
RSSSF National Team Results
RSSSF Baltic Cup 1992

 
Seasons in Estonian football